Scepsis is a genus of horseflies of the family Tabanidae.

Species
Scepsis appendiculata (Macquart, 1840)

References

Tabanidae
Tabanoidea genera
Diptera of South America
Taxa named by Francis Walker (entomologist)